Ion Zaharia (20 September 1929 – 5 November 1993) was a Romanian former football right midfielder and manager.

International career
Ion Zaharia played one friendly game at international level for Romania, in which he opened the score in a 2–0 victory against Norway.

Honours

Player
Petrolul Ploiești
Divizia A: 1957–58, 1958–59
Cupa României: 1962–63

Manager
CSMS Iași
Divizia B: 1967–68
CSU Galați
Cupa României runner-up: 1975–76

Notes

References

External links

Ion Zaharia player profile at Labtof.ro
Ion Zaharia manager profile at Labtof.ro

1929 births
1993 deaths
Romanian footballers
Romania international footballers
Association football midfielders
Liga I players
Liga II players
FC Petrolul Ploiești players
FCM Câmpina players
Romanian football managers